Ruth St. Denis (born Ruth Denis; January 20, 1879 – July 21, 1968) was an American pioneer of modern dance, introducing eastern ideas into the art. She was the co-founder of the American Denishawn School of Dancing and Related Arts and the teacher of several notable performers.

Biography

Ruth St. Denis was born on January 20, 1879. Her parents were Ruth Emma ( Hull) Denis (a physician by training), and Thomas Laban Denis, a machinist and inventor; they were not married. She was raised on the small Pin Oaks Farm in New Jersey, where she studied Christian Science. She used to invent melodramas, specialising in fainting and collapsing to the floor in front of an audience of friends. As a child, she learned exercises based on François Delsarte's Society Gymnastics and Voice Culture. This was the beginning of St. Denis's dance training, and was instrumental in developing her technique later in life. In 1891 she raised the money to travel briefly to New York, auditioning in the Marwig studio; she was pronounced to have talent, and her mother set about getting her into theatre. In 1892, she witnessed the Delsarte advocate Genevieve Stebbins performing a matinee, The Dance of Day; she described the experience as "the real birth of my art life". 

In 1894, after years of practicing Delsarte poses, she debuted as a skirt dancer for Worth's Family Theatre and Museum. From this modest start, she progressed to touring with an acclaimed producer and director, David Belasco. While touring in Belasco's production of Madame DuBarry in 1904 her life was changed. She was at a drugstore with another member of Belasco's company in Buffalo, New York, when she saw a poster advertising Egyptian Deities cigarettes. The poster portrayed the Egyptian goddess Isis enthroned in a temple; this image captivated St. Denis on the spot and inspired her to create dances that expressed the mysticism that the goddess's image conveyed. From then on, St. Denis was immersed in Oriental philosophies.
 
In 1905, St. Denis left Belasco's company to begin her career as a solo artist. It was about this time that she made her first European tour and used the stage name of St. Denis. Late in life she told Paul Hockings, her last research assistant, that she was waiting in a hotel with all the boxes of luggage, just before getting on the liner, when her mother walked around to each box, which had Miss Ruth's name on it, and added St.

The first piece that resulted from her interest in the Orient was Radha performed in 1906. Drawing from Hindu mythology, Radha is the story of Krishna and his love for a mortal milkmaid. Radha was originally performed to music from Léo Delibes' opera Lakmé. This piece was a celebration of the five senses and appealed to a contemporary fascination with the Orient. Although her choreography was not culturally accurate or authentic, it was expressive of the themes that St. Denis perceived in Oriental culture and highly entertaining to contemporary audiences. St. Denis believed dance to be a spiritual expression, and her choreography reflected this idea.

In 1911, a young dancer named Ted Shawn saw St. Denis perform in Denver; it was artistic love at first sight. In 1914, Shawn applied to be her student, and soon became her artistic partner and husband. Together they founded Denishawn, the "cradle of American modern dance." One of her more famous pupils was Martha Graham. Together St. Denis and Shawn founded the Los Angeles Denishawn school in 1915. Students studied ballet movements without shoes, ethnic and folk dances, Dalcroze Eurhythmics, and Delsarte gymnastics. In 1916 they created a collection of dances inspired by Egypt, which included Tillers of the Soil, a duet between St. Denis and Shawn, as well as Pyrrhic Dance, an all-male dance piece. Her exploration of the Orient continued into 1923 when she staged Ishtar of the Seven Gates in which she portrayed a Babylonian goddess. Together St. Denis and Shawn toured throughout the 1910s and 1920s, often performing their works on the vaudeville stage.

Other notable dancers such as Doris Humphrey, Lillian Powell, Evan-Burrows Fontaine and Charles Weidman also studied at Denishawn. Graham, Humphrey, Weidman and the future silent film star Louise Brooks all performed as dancers with the Denishawn company. At Denishawn, St. Denis served as inspiration to her young students, while Shawn taught the technique classes. Ruth St. Denis and Ted Shawn were also instrumental in creating the legendary dance festival Jacob's Pillow.

Although Denishawn had crumbled by 1930, St. Denis continued to dance, teach and choreograph independently as well as in collaboration with other artists. St. Denis no longer redirected her works from the mysteries of the Orient to combining religion and dance through her Rhythmic Choir of Dancers. Through these works it is said that St. Denis sought to become the Virgin Mary in the same manner in which she once sought to become goddesses. In 1938 St. Denis founded Adelphi University's dance program, one of the first dance departments in an American university. It has since become a cornerstone of Adelphi's Department of Performing Arts. She cofounded a second school in 1940, the School of Nataya, which focused on teaching Oriental dance. For many years St. Denis taught dance at her studio, at 3433 Cahuenga Boulevard West (near Universal City, California). On Sunday, September 16, 1962, she teamed with impresario Raymond D. Bowman to present a full-length Balinese shadow puppet performance (Wayang Kulit) at her studio, which lasted more than 8 hours. It was the first such performance in the United States.

Death and legacy

St. Denis died of a heart attack on July 21, 1968, aged 89, at Hollywood Presbyterian Hospital in Los Angeles.

Her legacy included not only her repertory of orient-inspired dances, but also students of Denishawn who later became pivotal figures in the world of modern dance. Many companies currently include a collection of her signature solos in their repertoires, including the programme, "The Art of the Solo", a showcase of famous solos of modern dance pioneers. Several early St. Denis solos (including "Incense" and "The Legend of the Peacock") were presented on September 29, 2006, at the Baltimore Museum of Art. 

A centennial salute was scheduled with the revival premiere of St. Denis' "Radha", commissioned by Countess Anastasia Thamakis of Greece. The program's director, Mino Nicolas, has been instrumental in the revival of these key solos. St. Denis was inducted into the National Museum of Dance's Mr. & Mrs. Cornelius Vanderbilt Whitney Hall of Fame in 1987. 

The global organization and activity, the Dances of Universal Peace, credits Ruth St. Denis for much of the inspiration behind its creation. The Dances of Universal Peace organization subsequently published many of St. Denis's writings on spiritual dance and the mysticism of the body.

Her students in turn taught their own students, spreading her influence through generations of modern dancers:

Ruth St. Denis
Ted Shawn—Shawn Fundamentals
Denishawn (school and company)
Doris Humphrey and Charles Weidman—The Art of Making Dances (Humphrey)
Humphrey-Weidman school—Humphrey-Weidman technique (fall and recovery)
José Limón—Limón technique
Martha Graham—Graham technique (and Louis Horst)
Erick Hawkins (via George Balanchine)—Hawkins technique
Anna Sokolow
May O'Donnell
Merce Cunningham—Cunningham technique (also see Postmodern dance)
Yvonne Rainer
Margaret Jenkins
Steve Paxton
Richard Alston
Paul Taylor
Twyla Tharp
Trisha Brown
Ohad Naharin

Works

Books

 Lotus Light. Poems. Boston/New York, 1932.
 An Unfinished Life: an Autobiography. Dance Horizons Republication, Brooklyn, New York, 1969.

Articles

 "Ballet of the States". Dance Chronicle. Studies in Dance and the Related Arts. Volume 20, Issue 1/1997, pp. 52–60. 
 "Dance as spiritual expression". Rogers, Frederick Rand (ed.): Dance: A Basic Educational Technique. A Functional Approach to the Use of Rhythmics and Dance as Prime Methods of Body Development and Control, and Transformation of Moral and Social Behaviour. Dance Horizons Inc., New York 1980, pp. 100–111, .
 "The Dance as Life Experience". Brown, Jean Morrison (ed.): The  Vision of Modern Dance. Princeton Book Company, Princeton/New Jersey 1979, pp. 21–25, . 
 "Religious Manifestations in the Dance". Sorell, Walter (ed.): The Dance has many Faces. Columbia University Press, New York/London 1968, pp. 12–18, . 
 "Freedom. A Rhythmic Interpretation". Dance Observer. Volume 23, Issue 1/1956, pp. 6–7.
 "What is Religious Dance?" Dance Observer. Volume 17, Issue 5/1950, pp. 68–69.
 "Seeds of a New Order". Division of Higher Education of the Board of Education of the United Methodist Church (ed.): Motive. Volume 8, Issue 7/1948, pp. 28–29.
 "My Vision". Dance Observer. Volume 7, Issue 3/1940, pp. 33, 42.
 "The Dance of the East". Theatre Arts Monthly. The International Magazine of Theatre and Screen. August 1927, pp. 605–612.

See also
 List of dancers
 Sada Yacco
 Ted Shawn
 Isadora Duncan
 Modern dance
 Women in dance
 Rue Saint-Denis (Paris) (homonym)
 Edna Guy

References

Further reading

 Bernardi, Vito di: Ruth St. Denis. Palermo, L'Epos, 2006. .
 Desmond, Jane: Dancing Out the Difference: Cultural Imperialism and Ruth St. Denis’s Radha of 1906. Dils, Ann/Cooper Albright, Ann (eds.): Moving History, Dancing Cultures. A Dance History Reader. Wesleyan University Press, Wesleyan 2001, pp. 256–270, .
 LaMothe, Kimerer L.: Passionate Madonna: The Christian Turn of American Dancer Ruth St. Denis. Journal of the American Academy of Religion. Volume 66, Issue 4/1998, pp. 747–769. 
 Miller, Kamae A.: Wisdom Comes Dancing: Selected Writings of Ruth St. Denis on Dance, Spirituality and the Body. Seattle: PeaceWorks. 1997. .
 Schlundt, Christena L: Into the mystic with Miss Ruth. Dance Perspectives Foundation, 1971.
 Schlundt, Christena L.: The Professional Appearances of Ruth St. Denis and Ted Shawn. A Chronology and an Index of Dances 1906–1932. Literary Licensing (LLC), New York 1962, .
 Shawn, Ted: Ruth St. Denis: pioneer & prophet; being a history of her cycle of oriental dances. Printed for J. Howell by J. H. Nash, 1920.
 
 Sherman, Jane/Schlundt, Christena L.: Who’s St. Denis? What Is She? Dance Chronicle. Studies in Dance and the Related Arts. Volume 10, Issue 3/1987, pp. 305–329.
 Terry, Walter: Miss Ruth: the "more living life" of Ruth St. Denis. Dodd, Mead, New York, 1969.

External links

 Society Gymnastics and Voice Culture. 
 Guide to the Clarence McGehee Collection on Ruth St. Denis. Special Collections and Archives, The UC Irvine Libraries, Irvine, California.
 Guide to the Photograph Collection on Ruth St. Denis. Special Collections and Archives, The UC Irvine Libraries, Irvine, California.
 Guide to the Ruth St. Denis Collection. University Archives and Special Collections, Adelphi University, Garden City, New York.
 Guide to the Barbara Andres Collection on Ruth St. Denis. University Archives and Special Collections, Adelphi University, Garden City, New York.
 Archive footage of Ruth St. Denis performing in Liebestraum in 1949 at Jacob's Pillow.
 Chapter 2: The Solo Dancers: Ruth St. Denis (1879–1968) from "The Early Moderns Web Tutorial" at the University of Pittsburgh
 Archive footage of Ruth St. Denis performing "The Delirium of the Senses" from Radha in 1941 at Jacob's Pillow
 Europa (Ruth St. Denis in Europe: by Sandra Meinzenbach; German language)
 Ruth St. Denis (1879–1968). America’s Divine Dancer (by Thom Hecht)
 Ruth St. Denis: In Search of a Goddess (by Mary Manning/Adelphi University)
 Images from the St. Denis (Ruth) Papers. Library Special Collections, UCLA Library
Ruth St. Denis – Broadway Photographs
Radio interview with Ruth St. Denis at The WNYC Archives

1879 births
1968 deaths
Adelphi University faculty
American choreographers
American dancers
American female dancers
American women choreographers
Burials at Forest Lawn Memorial Park (Hollywood Hills)
Dancers from New Jersey
Dancers from New York (state)
Modern dancers
People associated with physical culture
Vaudeville performers
American women academics